Pauline Sears (1908-1993) was an American educational psychologist.

References

1908 births
1993 deaths